Gulella amaniensis is a species of very small air-breathing land snails, terrestrial pulmonate gastropod mollusks in the family Streptaxidae. This species is endemic to Tanzania.

References 

Fauna of Tanzania
Gulella
Gastropods described in 1953
Taxonomy articles created by Polbot